The 1976–77 season was the 73rd season of competitive football in Turkey.

Overview
Trabzonspor won their second 1.Lig (First Division) title in 1976–77. Necmi Perekli, forward for Trabzonspor, finished top scorer with 18 goals. Fenerbahçe finished runners-up, while Altay finished third, with both clubs earning a spot in the UEFA Cup. Göztepe and Giresunspor were relegated to the 2.Lig (Second Division), while Ankaragücü and Diyarbakırspor gained promotion to the 1.Lig. Trabzonspor did the double by defeating Beşiktaş in the final of the Turkish Cup. Trabzonspor also won the Cumhurbaşkanlığı Kupası (Super Cup), again defeating Beşiktaş.

The club competed in the 1976–77 European Cup. Having beaten Íþróttabandalag Akraness in the first round, Trabzonspor faced Liverpool in the second round. The club won the first leg 1 – 0 at home, but lost the second leg 0 – 3 in Liverpool. Fenerbahçe and Adanaspor were both knocked out in the first round of the 1976–77 UEFA Cup. Galatasaray reached the second round of the 1976–77 European Cup Winners' Cup before crashing out against R.S.C. Anderlecht.

Awards
Gol Kralı (Goal King)
Necmi Perekli (Trabzonspor) – 18 goals

Honours

European qualification

Final league table

Notes
Tiebreakers are the average of goals scored to goals allowed.

Türkiye Kupası final
First leg

Second leg

National team
The Turkey national football team competed in eight matches during the 1976–77 season. The team finished with a record of three wins, three draws, and two losses. Cemil Turan scored five goals in eight caps.

References